Azzun (also spelled Azzoun) (from the root word عز ′izz which means honor or esteem) is a Palestinian town in Qalqilya Governorate in the northern West Bank, located 9 kilometers east of Qalqilya and 24 kilometers south of Tulkarm. According to the Palestinian Central Bureau of Statistics census, Azzun, together with the adjacent villages of Islah and Izbat al-Tabib, had a population of over 8,900 in 2007. The vast majority of the inhabitants are Muslim, with a very small Christian minority.

Location
‘Azzun is located 7-9 km west of Qalqiliya. It is bordered by Kafr Laqif  and Wadi Qana to the east, Kafr Thulth  to the south, An Nabi Elyas  to the west, and Jayyus and Khirbet Sir to the north.

History

Ottoman era
Just north of the village six -seven dry stone towers were examined in 1873. The best-preserved had six courses standing, and part of the roof. The locals stated that they were ancient vineyard towers.

Azzun was a site of battle - part of Napoleon Bonaparte's campaign in Ottoman Syria. An Arab poet, Ibrahim Touqan was quoted as saying, "by means of Azzun, how soaked [in] the blood [of] Franks [in the] mother valley."

When the French army marched into Palestine under the command of Napoleon in February 1799, it faced powerful and unexpected resistance from the inhabitants of Jabal Nablus under the command of their local leaders. They attacked the French army while it was marching towards Acre, especially near the valley of Azzun, taking part in the battle of Tal-Tabur. The participation of the inhabitants and local leaders of Nablus in the struggle against Napoleon reflected a territorial sense in resistance to a foreign army. 

Ihsan al-Nimr wrote that “the truth is that [Bonaparte’s] morale was weakened around Jabal Nablus, in the valley of Azzun, Qaqun, and al-Marj ... he headed for Acre with disappointment and without determination”. Sheikh Yussuf Jarrar wrote a poem asking the inhabitants, especially the prominent families of Jabal Nablus, to march towards Acre in order to fight the French. 

In Doumani's words, the poet exposes “the cohesiveness of this reign’s social formation and the shared sense of identity among its inhabitants versus the factionalism of multiple territorially based centers of power... The most striking aspect of this poem is what it does not say. Not once in its twenty-one verses does it mention Ottoman rule, much less the need to protect the empire or the glory and honor of serving the sultan” Pierre Jacotin called the village Hazoun on his map in 1799 from the same campaign.

In 1838, the American scholar Edward Robinson noted  Azzun as a village in the Beni Sa'ab district, west of Nablus.

In 1852 Robinson visited the village, which he described as having 290 males, all Muslim except for one family of Christians. In 1882, the PEF'sSurvey of Western Palestine described Azzun as a "small village lying low on the hill-side, with several wells and olives on every side."

British Mandate era
In the 1922 census of Palestine conducted by the British Mandate authorities, Azzun had a population of 700; 691 Muslims and 9 Christians,  increasing in the 1931 census to 994: 980 Muslim and 14 Christians in a total of 218 houses.

In the 1945 statistics the population of Azzun together with Nabi Ilyas and Islah was 1,190; 1,170 Muslims and 20 Christians.  Residents owned 23,496 dunams of land, according to an official land and population survey. Of this, 5,494 dunams were for plantations and irrigable land and 1,420 were used for cereals, while 55 dunams were built-up (urban) land.

Jordanian era
In the wake of the 1948 Arab–Israeli War, and after the 1949 Armistice Agreements, Azzun came under Jordanian rule. It was annexed by Jordan in 1950.

The Jordanian census of 1961 found 2,096 inhabitants in Azzun.

1967 and aftermath
Since the Six-Day War, Azzun has been under Israeli occupation. After the 1995 accords, about 24.7% of the land was classified as Area B, the remaining 75.3% as Area C. Israel has expropriated 268 dunums of village land for the construction of the Israeli settlement of Ma'ale Shomron.

In 1996 a municipal council was established to administer Azzun's civil affairs. The council has eleven members appointed by the Palestinian government. In 2012, the villages of Islah and Izbat al-Tabib were merged into the municipality of Azzun upon decree of the Palestinian Ministry of Local Government.

In 2008, the town's unemployment rate was 19%. In 2012, it had increased sharply to 39%.

Today, the town consists of 9,130 dunams of which 1,209 dunams is built-up area. There are four mosques located in the town. Most of the population works in agriculture and herding (40%) or trade and handicrafts (41%), while the 19% work in public sectors. The major families of Azzun are the ‘Adwan, Badwan, Radwan, Salim, Hussein, Sweidan, Zamari (or Zummary), Abu Hanniya, Odah, Hawashah, Tabib, Suleiman, Radi, Mas’ud and Abu Dayyah.

As of 2018, Azzun was reported to be the village "with highest number of child arrests in the West Bank per capita."

References

Bibliography

al-Nimr, Ihsan, (1938–1975): Tarikh Jabal Nablus wa-l-Balqaʼ [History of Mount Nablus and al-Balqa’] (Nablus: Matbaʻat jamiʻat ʻummal al-matabiʻ al-taʻawuniyya),

External links
Welcome To 'Azzun
Survey of Western Palestine, Map 11:   IAA, Wikimedia commons
  'Azzun  (Fact Sheet),   Applied Research Institute–Jerusalem (ARIJ)
 ‘Azzun Town Profile (including ‘Isla & ‘Izbat at Tabib Localities), ARIJ,
Azzun  (aerial photo), ARIJ
Development Priorities and Needs in ‘Azzun (including ‘Isla & ‘Izbat at Tabib Localities), ARIJ

Qalqilya Governorate
Towns in the West Bank
Municipalities of the State of Palestine